Ivan Santaromita (born 30 April 1984) is an Italian former professional road bicycle racer, who rode professionally between 2006 and 2019 for the , , , ,  and  teams.

His brother Mauro-Antonio and nephew Alessandro are also professional cyclists.

Career
In 2010, he took his first significant victory as a professional in the Settimana Internazionale di Coppi e Bartali, dominating the stage race as he won it with more than a minute-and-a-half of an advantage over Przemysław Niemiec.

In 2013, Santaromita won the third stage of the Giro del Trentino. He approached the finish line with Michele Scarponi and Paolo Tiralongo, the trio being the remnants of an early breakaway. Santaromita outsprinted the pair to claim his first victory since 2010.

In 2014, Santaromita was the first rider to withdraw from the Vuelta a España on stage 7 after breaking a finger in a crash.

In 2015, he came in sixth position in the general classification of the Tour of Norway.

Major results

2005
 4th Piccolo Giro di Lombardia
2007
 10th Overall Tour de Georgia
2008
 1st Stage 1 (TTT) Vuelta a España
2009
 3rd Japan Cup
2010
 1st  Overall Settimana Internazionale di Coppi e Bartali
1st Stage 1b (TTT)
 2nd Road race, National Road Championships
 5th Gran Premio dell'Insubria-Lugano
2012
 1st Stage 1 (TTT) Giro del Trentino
2013
 1st  Road race, National Road Championships (Trofeo Melinda)
 1st Stage 3 Giro del Trentino
 5th Gran Premio della Costa Etruschi
 9th Giro di Lombardia
2014
 1st Stage 1 (TTT) Giro d'Italia
2015
 5th Prueba Villafranca de Ordizia
 6th Overall Tour of Norway
2016
 7th Overall Tour de Langkawi
2017
 8th Pro Ötztaler 5500
 9th Overall Tour of Slovenia
 9th Giro dell'Appennino
 10th Overall Tour of Japan
2018
 4th Road race, National Road Championships
 5th Japan Cup

Grand Tour general classification results timeline

References

External links

Italian male cyclists
1984 births
Living people
Cyclists from Varese